Arnold Pressburger (27 August 1885 – 17 February 1951) was an Austrian Jewish film producer who produced more than 70 films between 1913 and 1951. Pressburger was born in Pressburg, Austria-Hungary (now Bratislava, Slovakia) and died in Hamburg, Germany from a stroke.

In 1932, he set up the production company Cine-Allianz with Gregor Rabinovitch. The company enjoyed commercial success, but was subsequently expropriated from them by the Nazi government of Germany as part of the anti-Jewish policy.

Partial filmography 

 Martyr of His Heart (1918)
 The Other I (1918)
 Gypsy Love (1922)
 Masters of the Sea (1922)
 Children of the Revolution (1923)
 Young Medardus (1923)
 Miss Madame (1923)
 Avalanche (1923)
 Nameless (1923)
 Moon of Israel (1924)
 The Revenge of the Pharaohs (1925)
 One Does Not Play with Love (1926)
 Unmarried Daughters (1926)
 The Famous Woman (1927)
 Ghost Train (1927)
 Odette (1928)
 The Wrecker (1929)
 Land Without Women (1929)
 Three Days Confined to Barracks (1930)
 The Singing City (1930)
 Twice Married (1930)
 Dolly Gets Ahead (1930)
 The Virtuous Sinner (1931)
 My Cousin from Warsaw (1931)
 Calais-Dover (1931)
 No More Love (1931)
 Danton (1931)
 City of Song (1931)
 In the Employ of the Secret Service (1931)
 Berlin-Alexanderplatz (1931)
 No Money Needed (1932)
 Tell Me Tonight (1932)
 The Song of Night (1932)
 Spies at Work (1933)
 A Song for You (1933)
 All for Love (1933)
 My Heart Calls You (1934)
 So Ended a Great Love (1934)
 My Heart Is Calling You (1934)
 The Divine Spark (1935)
 My Heart is Calling (1935)
 The Blonde Carmen (1935)
 Conquest of the Air (1936)
 Return of the Scarlet Pimpernel (1937)
 Conflict (1938)
 The Lafarge Case (1938)
 Love Cavalcade (1940)
 The Shanghai Gesture (1941)
 Hangmen Also Die! (1943)
 It Happened Tomorrow (1944)
 A Scandal in Paris (1946)
 The Lost One (1951)

References

External links 
 

1885 births
1951 deaths
Jewish emigrants from Austria to the United Kingdom after the Anschluss
20th-century Austrian people
Austrian film producers
German film producers
Hungarian film producers
Hungarian Jews
Film people from Bratislava